Linda Nosková (born 17 November 2004) is a Czech tennis player. She has a career-high singles ranking by the Women's Tennis Association (WTA) of No. 50, reached on 6 February 2023, and a career-high doubles ranking of world No. 160, set on 3 October 2022. In August 2022, she became the youngest player in the top 100, a distinction Coco Gauff previously had held since October 2019. On the ITF Circuit, she has collected six singles titles and one doubles title. Her biggest title so far was at the $100k Reinert Open in Versmold.

From an early age, Nosková showed signs of becoming a promising tennis player. As a junior, she peaked at world No. 5 in the rankings, achieved on 14 June 2021. Despite having only four Grand Slam appearances as a junior (per two in both events), she won the 2021 French Open in the girls' singles event. In addition, she made the semifinal of the girls' doubles event in the same edition, as well as the quarterfinal of the 2020 Australian Open.

Early life
Nosková grew up in the village of Bystřička in the Vsetín region. Her first touch with tennis was at the age of seven, when she started training in Valašské Meziříčí. Three years later, she became a player for TK Na Dolina in Trojanovice near Frenštát pod Radhoštěm. In 2018, she moved to Přerov because of tennis.

Junior career
Junior Grand Slam results - Singles:
 Australian Open: 2R (2020)
 French Open: W (2021)
 Wimbledon: –
 US Open: –

Junior Grand Slam results - Doubles:
 Australian Open: QF (2020)
 French Open: SF (2021)
 Wimbledon: –
 US Open: –
Nosková won the 2021 French Open girls' singles title. On 14 June 2021, she reached world No. 5 in the combined ITF junior rankings.

Professional career

2019–21: Four ITF Circuit titles
Nosková made her ITF Circuit debut in July 2019 at the $25k Torino tournament in qualifying. Despite failing to reach the main-draw, she got to the quarterfinal in the doubles event. In October of the same year, she made her singles main-draw debut at the $15k Lousada tournament and also won her first match as a senior. The following week, in the same city, she reached her first semifinal. A month later, she reached another semifinal, this time at the $15k Milovice event in her home country.

Her 2020 season started in August 2020 with the qualifying draw of the Prague Open, but she lost to Laura Ioana Paar. Three weeks later, she made her debut at the WTA Challenger Tour, playing at the Sparta Prague Open. Getting there after receiving a wildcard, she lost to Mayar Sherif in the first round. She finished her season with the $25k Přerov tournament where she lost to Barbora Krejčíková in the first round. It was only her third tournament of the year as well as her only tournament in doubles. In doubles, she also lost in the first round.

Nosková started the 2021 season in the middle of February at the $15k Sharm El Sheikh event where she reached her first ITF final. After losing to Shalimar Talbi in the final, she reached another semifinal there the following week. In March 2021, she won her first senior ITF title at the $15k event in Bratislava, defeating fellow Czech Tereza Smitková in the final. Right after that, she won another $15k event in Bratislava (back-to-back titles), this time defeating Iva Primorac in the final. In June 2021, she reached the semifinal of the Macha Lake Open in Staré Splavy in both events, losing to Zheng Qinwen in singles. It was her first semifinal of a $60k event, but in August, she won her first $60k title at the Zubr Cup in Přerov. In the final, she defeated Alexandra Cadanțu-Ignatik. In October, she advanced to her first ITF final in doubles. A month later, she finished the year at the $25k Milove tournament where she won her fourth title in singles and finished as a runner-up in doubles.

2022: Major & top 100 debuts, doubles win over Williams sisters

She made her Grand Slam main-draw debut at the French Open as a qualifier, making her the youngest Czech player to compete at a major since Nicole Vaidišová (17 years 127 days) at the 2006 US Open and the youngest player to qualify for the tournament since 16-year-old Michelle Larcher de Brito in 2009. In the first round of the main draw, she faced US Open champion Emma Raducanu but lost despite winning the first set. The following week, she reached the semifinals of the WTA 125 Makarska International Championships.

In July, she won her first $100k title at the Reinert Open defeating Ysaline Bonaventure in the final. Three weeks later, she entered her first WTA Tour semifinal at the Prague Open where she lost to compatriot and later champion, Marie Bouzková. There she marked her first top 50 win, after defeating Alizé Cornet in the second round. This result led her into the top 100 for the first time, at world No. 94, becoming the youngest woman in the top 100, a distinction Coco Gauff previously held since October 2019. By reaching the semifinals, she became the youngest Czech woman to reach a tour-level semifinal since Vaidišová (17 years, 189 days) in Linz in 2006.

At the US Open, she competed in her second Grand Slam qualifying and advanced to the main draw with three qualifying wins. In the second round, she defeated former top-10 player Eugenie Bouchard. However, she lost in the first round of the main draw to Bouzková in a three-set match. Partnering with Lucie Hradecká, she defeated Serena and Venus Williams in her debut major doubles match.

2023: First two top-10 wins & WTA Tour final, top 50
Ranked No. 102 at the start of the Adelaide International 1, she came through qualifying beating Anna Kalinskaya and Anastasia Potapova to make the main draw. In the first round, she beat world No. 8, Daria Kasatkina, to get her first top 10 win, and in the second, she beat fellow qualifier Claire Liu to make her first WTA 500 quarterfinal. She defeated 2-time major champion and former world No. 1, Victoria Azarenka, in a three-set thriller in the quarterfinals, winning the final set tiebreak 8–6, while also saving one match point. She then beat top seed and world No. 2, Ons Jabeur, to reach her first ever WTA Tour final which she lost to second seed Aryna Sabalenka in straight sets. As a result, she moved close to 50 positions up in the rankings to No. 56. Despite being ranked well inside the top 100 by the start of the Australian Open, Nosková needed to play qualifying in order to gain entry to the main draw, due to the sudden nature of her rise up the rankings. However, she lost in the first round of qualifying to world No. 192, Katherine Sebov.

Performance timelines
Only main-draw results in WTA Tour, Grand Slam tournaments, Fed Cup/Billie Jean King Cup and Olympic Games are included in win–loss records.

Singles
Current after the 2023 BNP Paribas Open.

Doubles
Current after the 2022 season.

WTA career finals

Singles: 1 (runner-up)

ITF Circuit finals

Singles: 7 (6 titles, 1 runner-up)

Doubles: 5 (1 title, 4 runner-ups)

Junior finals

Grand Slam tournaments

Girls' singles: 1 (title)

Junior Circuit finals

Singles: 5 (4 titles, 1 runner–up)

Doubles: 6 (3 titles, 3 runner–ups)

Record against other players

Record against top 10 players 

 She has a 2–2 record against players who were, at the time the match was played, ranked in the top 10.

Notes

References

External links
 
 

2004 births
Living people
Czech female tennis players
Grand Slam (tennis) champions in girls' singles
French Open junior champions
Sportspeople from Přerov
21st-century Czech women